

List of Colonial Heads of Fort of São João Baptista de Ajudá

Territory located in present-day coastal Benin

Sources
http://www.vdiest.nl/Africa/benin.htm
https://web.archive.org/web/20050131222928/http://www.geocities.com/CapitolHill/Rotunda/2209/Sao_Joao_Baptista.html

See also
Benin
Heads of state of Benin
Heads of government of Benin
Colonial heads of Benin (Dahomey)
Ouidah
Lists of office-holders

Benin history-related lists
Portuguese colonial governors and administrators
Portuguese colonisation in Africa
Portuguese forts